The 1852 United States presidential election in Connecticut took place on November 2, 1852, as part of the 1852 United States presidential election. Voters chose six representatives, or electors to the Electoral College, who voted for President and Vice President.

Connecticut voted for the Democratic candidate, Franklin Pierce, over the Whig Party candidate, Winfield Scott. Pierce won the state by a narrow margin of 4.33%.

A Democratic presidential nominee would not win Connecticut again until Samuel J. Tilden narrowly won it in 1876.

Results

See also
 United States presidential elections in Connecticut

References

Connecticut
1852
1852 Connecticut elections